Australotitan is an extinct genus of titanosaurian sauropod that existed during the Cenomanian-Turonian age of the Late Cretaceous in what is now southern-central Queensland, Australia. The genus contains a single species, Australotitan cooperensis.

Discovery and naming 
Australotitan was discovered in 2005 within the Winton Formation of southwest Queensland, Australia, near the town of Eromanga. Sandy Mackenzie, the discoverer, had already collected other bones on the land of his parents in 2004. The fossil material was then prepared and excavated in conjunction with the Queensland Museum and the Eromanga Natural History Museum between November 2005 and April 2010. It was nicknamed "Cooper" after its discovery being from the Cooper-Eromanga Basin, Cooper Creek system, ‘the Cooper Country”. The holotype, EMF102 (nicknamed "Cooper"), was described in 2021 on the basis of a partial skeleton consisting of a partial left scapula, partial left and complete right humeri, right ulna, the right and left pubes and ischia, and partial right and left femora. An additional three specimens were referred to the genus: EMF164, nicknamed "George," (fragmented femur, ulna, presacral vertebrae, and rib material), EMF105 (a complete femur), and EMF165 (a distal humerus).

Several of the fossils found and worked on at Eromanga Natural History Museum are seen to have been trampled and compressed during deposition. This was the result of multiple smaller sauropods walking in a single line. The type species, A. cooperensis, was named and described by Scott A. Hocknull, Melville Wilkinson, Rochelle A. Lawrence, Vladislav Konstantinov, Stuart Mackenzie and Robyn Mackenzie in 2021. The generic name, Australotitan, combines the Latin word "australis," meaning "southern," as it was found in Australia (which is sometimes referred to as "The Great Southern Land"), with the Greek word "Tιτάν" meaning "titan", in reference to the Greek mythological Titans and the dinosaur's gigantic size. The specific name, cooperensis, refers to the Cooper Creek system near the initial location of the holotype, and the nickname given to the holotype when it was discovered.

Description 
Australotitan represents the largest known Australian dinosaur. The describing authors deliberately abstained from providing a size estimate, as it is notoriously difficult to obtain reliable results for sauropods. The discovery of Australotitan indicates that the gigantic titanosaurian sauropods were present during the mid-Cretaceous of eastern Gondwana.

Classification 
In a phylogenetic analysis performed by Hocknull et al., Australotitan was recovered as a titanosaur. In eleven out of fourteen analyses, it was placed in a clade with the contemporaneous Titanosaur Diamantinasaurus, which, depending on the dataset, also included other Winton Formation Sauropods Wintonotitan and Savannasaurus, and sometimes also Sarmientosaurus, Baotianmansaurus, Dongyangosaurus, Erketu, and Pitekunsaurus. This places it in the clade Diamantinasauria sensu Poropat et al. (2021).

References 

Titanosaurs
Fossils of Australia
Fossil taxa described in 2021
Cretaceous dinosaurs of Australia